Pethia canius is a species of cyprinid fish native to India where it is found in sluggish streams in West Bengal, India.  This species can reach a length of  SL.

References 

Pethia
Fish described in 1822
Taxa named by Francis Buchanan-Hamilton